Langosco is a comune (municipality) in the Province of Pavia in the Italian region Lombardy, located about  southwest of Milan and about  west of Pavia.

Langosco borders the following municipalities: Candia Lomellina, Caresana, Cozzo, Motta de' Conti, Rosasco.

Demographic evolution

References

Cities and towns in Lombardy